Bakhtiarabad may refer to:

 Qaleh-ye Bakhtiar, Chaharmahal and Bakhtiari, a village in Iran
 Bukhtiarabad Domki, a town in Pakistan